Ardeirhynchus is a genus of parasitic worms belonging to the family Polymorphidae.

The species of this genus are found in Northern America.

Species:

Ardeirhynchus spiralis

References

Polymorphidae
Acanthocephala genera